The Cerro El Copey National Park Also Cerro El Copey-Jóvito Villalba National Park Is a protected area with the status of a national park located to the east of the Caribbean island of Margarita, in the highest mountainous region of Nueva Esparta State in Venezuela. It was created in 1974 with the purpose of protecting an outstanding physiographic feature with an ecosystem that includes several plant formations, high levels of endemism and the only permanent water sources of the island.

It is surrounded by desert plains and this is why, despite its scarce 960 m elevation, it has green forests and montane grasslands that feed on the humidity provided by the trade winds. In the lower areas of the Park, dry forests predominate And semi-deciduous and surrounded by villages and plantations, some of which have recently invaded the grounds of the park.

Gallery

See also
List of national parks of Venezuela
Sierra Nevada National Park (Venezuela)

References

National parks of Venezuela
Protected areas established in 1974
Tourist attractions in Nueva Esparta
Geography of Nueva Esparta
1974 establishments in Venezuela